The Scaligero Castle is a fortress from the Scaliger era, access point to the historical centre of Sirmione, on Lake Garda.
It's one of Italy's best preserved castles. In 2019 it was the 22nd most visited attraction in Italy, with 308,459 visitors.

History

Built in the latter half of the 14th century on the southernmost part of Lake Garda in Northern Italy. Construction was initiated on behalf of the Della Scala family of Verona, who are known as the Scaligeri from which it takes it name. The family ruled Verona and a large part of the Venetian area from the years 1259 to 1387.

The castle was later controlled by the Republic of Venice from the 15th century after the Della Scala family submitted to Venice in 1405. It continued to be an important fortification in the area. Its decline in importance began with the completion of the nearby fortress in Peschiera del Garda in the 16th century.

It continued to be used as an armory and fortification until the Unification of Italy when it became the office of the local government of Sirmione.  Restoration began after World War I in 1919, when it became a museum and tourist attraction. However it was not fully restored until 2018 when the internal waters of the castle were cleared. The internal docks are the only surviving example of a 14th-century fortified port.

See also
List of castles in Italy

Note

External links

Buildings and structures completed in the 14th century
Castles in Lombardy
Tourist attractions in Lombardy
Water castles